Preston Pig is a British traditionally animated children's television series which aired on CITV. It was based on a series of books, published by Colin McNaughton. It was shown at weekdays from 3pm until 3:15pm, on the television channel shown in Britain, CITV. However, since 2011, it no longer airs on CITV. The show officially went into production in March 1999, to air in September 2000.

Characters
 Preston Pig: The main character, a pig who is a football fanatic.
 Mr. Wolf: A wolf who always unsuccessfully tries to catch Preston for dinner.
 Pumpkin: is Preston's best friend.
 Granny: Preston's grandmother.
 Billy: A bully who is rude to little pigs.

Episodes

Voice Cast
Nicky Croydon as Preston
Hugh Laurie as Mr Wolf
Adam Godley as Preston's Dad
Ada Posta as Preston's Mum
Neil McCaul as Additional Voices
Susan Sheridan as Pumpkin/Additional Voices

The music was composed by Keith Hopwood.

Home Media
Preston Pig was released on VHS in the United Kingdom in 2000 and tapes were released in Australia, these video tape releases are called Pig School and Ham of the Match, and then the show was released on DVD in the United Kingdom. The DVD release of Preston Pig is called Football Champion.

Broadcast 
Preston Pig aired on CITV in the United Kingdom. However, the programme itself no longer airs on CITV, but can apparently be found on DVD, VHS and online.

References

External links
 

2000 British television series debuts
2000 British television series endings
2000s British children's television series
2000s British animated television series
British children's animated television shows
British television shows based on children's books
English-language television shows
ITV children's television shows
Animated television series about pigs
Television series about wolves